Dularcha is a national park in Queensland, Australia, 78 km north of Brisbane. The park occupies a north east portion of Landsborough. It is bisected by the North Coast railway line. It lies within the  Mooloolah River water catchment area of the South East Queensland bioregion.

The park features the heritage-listed Dularcha railway tunnel which was built in 1891.  The park was initially declared so as to ensure rail passengers were provided a decent view of Queensland's forest.  Use of the tunnel halted in 1932 when the line was moved to the east. The tunnel now serves as a seasonal lodge for a variety of small bats, including large-footed myotis. The park was extended in 2010 when Mooloolah Forest Reserve was added to the national park.

The park contains a riverine wetland covering .  A total of nine rare of threatened species have been identified within the park.

Dularcha National Park has a mild subtropical climate.

Facilities
The only facilities provided are trails. Birdwatching, horse-riding, bush-walking and bike-riding are the main recreational activities in Dularcha. Camping is not permitted within the park. Domestic animals (with the exception of horses), fires, motorbikes and vehicles are banned.

See also

 Protected areas of Queensland

References

National parks of South East Queensland
Protected areas established in 1921
1921 establishments in Australia